Hasan Doğan Sports Hall is a multi-purpose indoor sport venue located in Canik district of Samsun Province, northern Turkey.
It was named in honor of Hasan Doğan (1956–2008), who served as the president of the Turkish Football Federation.

The sports hall hosts basketball and volleyball competitions. It is the home ground of the women's basketball team of 
Canik belediyespor.

International events hosted
The venue will host volleyball events of the 2017 Summer Deaflympics.

References

Sports venues in Samsun
Indoor arenas in Turkey
Basketball venues in Turkey
Volleyball venues in Turkey
Canik